María Antonietta Berriozábal (née Rodriguez Arredondo; born 1941) is an American activist and author living in San Antonio, Texas. In 1981, she became the first Hispanic woman to serve on the city council of San Antonio, where she served District One for ten years. She became a local activist for the Chicano movement aligning with members of the Raza Unida Party such as Rosie Castro.

Early life and education 
Berriozábal's grandparents moved to Laredo, Texas, from Mexico during the Mexican Revolution of 1910. Then, in 1942, the family moved to San Antonio. When she was young, she attended Christ the King Private School and later graduated from Providence High School. After graduation from high school at the age of eighteen, she worked with The Salvation Army while taking college courses at night at the University of Texas at San Antonio. She graduated in 1979 with a bachelor's degree, which took her 20 years to complete.

Career 
Berriozábal worked with The Salvation Army for seven years before moving into politics. She worked for John A. Daniels, chair of the Democratic Party in Bexar County as a legal secretary for Hemisphere '68. Her duties included assisting in composing contracts between and foreign, national, and state governments, as well as concessionaires and exhibitors, while also translating documents arriving from Mexico and Argentina from Spanish to English. 

After John Daniels was ousted from the Democratic Party, Berriozábal joined Hubert Humphrey's campaign as campaign manager in Bexar County. After Humphrey's loss, Berriozábal worked for seven years as Judge Blair Reeves’ executive secretary at the county courthouse. She interned with Councilman Henry Cisneros and obtained a job with the San Antonio Census Bureau in 1980.

After assisting Henry Cisneros with his campaign to become mayor of San Antonio, Berriozábal sought to fill  the vacant seat of District 1 councilperson. After campaigning with the assistance of John Garcia, John Alvarado, Sylvia Rodriguez, and Luz Escamilla, Berriozábal won the position for District 1 with 55% of the vote. She served on the city council for ten years. 

Berriozábal’s public service includes appointments as the U.S. representative to the Inter-American Commission for Women, an agency within the Organization of American States, and as a delegate to the United Nationals' Fourth World Conference in Beijing, China.

Later life 
In 1993, Berriozábal was honored with the Benetia Humanitarian award for her efforts within the community such as organizing the Sisters of Charity, served as the Visitation House's president of the board, and creating the Hispanas Unidas organization located at Our Lady of the Lake University. She went on to become the U.S. Representative to the Inter-American Commission on Women of the Organization of American States agency and member of the U.S. Official Delegation to the Fourth World Conference on Women contributing to the world movement to improve on the conditions of women throughout other countries. Berriozábal helped found the Santuario Sisterfarm to promote “…a holistic understanding of justice, which embraces social justice principles, cultural diversity, and biodiversity.” She currently advocates for human rights, cultural diversity, and economic justice within the city of San Antonio, such as protesting for nine hours, alongside fifteen students, outside the office of Senator Kay Bailey Hutchison for her support on the DREAM Act in 2010.

Personal life 
While meeting Bishop Patricio Flores of Our Lady of Guadalupe church about the Mexican American Cultural Center, Manuel Berriozábal arrived to seek a job at the University of Texas. Maria and Manuel Berriozábal married in 1975 and moved to New Orleans where Manuel was teaching at Tulane University. After nine months living in New Orleans, the couple moved back to San Antonio where Manuel Berriozábal taught mathematics at the University of Texas at San Antonio and Berriozábal obtained her political science degree from the same university.

References 

1941 births
Living people
American women writers
Minority rights activists
American humanitarians
Women humanitarians
American civil rights activists
Women civil rights activists
San Antonio City Council members
American non-fiction writers
University of Texas at San Antonio alumni
Women city councillors in Texas
Hispanic and Latino American city council members